"Deeply Dippy" is a song by British trio Right Said Fred from their debut album, Up (1992). Written by Right Said Fred and produced by Tommy D, "Deeply Dippy" was the third single by Right Said Fred. It bested the number-two chart peak of "I'm Too Sexy" in the United Kingdom by peaking atop the UK Singles Chart for three weeks in April 1992, replacing Shakespears Sister's two month chart-topping single, "Stay".

Outside the United Kingdom, "Deeply Dippy" reached number one in Ireland for four weeks and entered the top 20 in Austria, Belgium, Germany, the Netherlands, and New Zealand. The song failed to chart in the United States, where "I'm Too Sexy" had reached number one, other than on the Billboard Hot Dance Club Play chart, peaking at number nine. It did manage to reach the top 100 in Canada, climbing to number 82 in August 1992.

Track listings
 UK 7-inch and cassette single 
 "Deeply Dippy" (single mix)
 "Deeply Dubby" (single mix)

 UK CD single 
 "Deeply Dippy" (single mix)
 "Deeply Dippy" (Deeply Brassy)
 "Deeply Dippy" (Deeply Nervous)
 "I'm Too Sexy" (extended club mix)

 Australian CD single 
 "Deeply Dippy" (single mix)
 "Deeply Dippy" (Deeply Brassy)
 "I'm Too Sexy" (Italian version)

Charts

Weekly charts

Year-end charts

Certifications

Covers
The song was later covered by the Rockingbirds, on the Terence Higgins Trust, supporting charity EP The Fred EP.

In popular culture
The song was featured in an advert for Sun Bingo in September 2015. It was also featured in an advert, "Deal of the Decade", for the range of the Fiat Punto and Fiat Stilo, in July 2002. The song's background music, was also featured, and used by Heart Yorkshire, for their Yorkshire Song in July 2014, as promotion for the bike race, the Tour de France, with changed lyrics to be based around Yorkshire.

Colleagues in the Sainsbury's in Heaton performed their own version of the song, in March 2011, as part of raising money for Red Nose Day 2011.

References

1992 singles
1992 songs
Charisma Records singles
Irish Singles Chart number-one singles
Right Said Fred songs
UK Singles Chart number-one singles
Songs written by Richard Fairbrass
Songs written by Fred Fairbrass
Songs written by Rob Manzoli